Kwadwo Asenso Okyere  (1947–2014) was a Ghanaian and a former Vice Chancellor of the University of Ghana He was a Fellow of the Ghana Academy of Arts and Sciences.

Education
Asenso Okyere had his secondary education at Tweneboa Kodua Senior High School and Prempeh College in Kumasi. He was educated at the University of Ghana.

References

2014 deaths
Ghanaian  academic administrators
Vice-Chancellors of the University of Ghana
Prempeh College alumni
Fellows of the Ghana Academy of Arts and Sciences